WHEO (1270 AM) is a classic hits and oldies formatted broadcast radio station licensed to Stuart, Virginia, serving Stuart and Patrick County, Virginia.  WHEO is owned and operated by Patrick Community Media, Inc.

WHEO runs 24/7 on 92.7FM, the AM transmitter (1270) goes silent after dark.

The station is an affiliate of the syndicated Pink Floyd program "Floydian Slip.", BIG JIM'S BIG JAMZ, Dead Til Midnight, MG Kelly programs (Classic Hit List, Live From The 60s, & American Hit List).

Signing off and back on
WHEO fell Silent on August 31, 2014 due to low advertising revenue.  On September 1, 2015, less than one day before the station's license expired, WHEO returned to the air.  WHEO returned to the air with the help of financial support from "angel lenders in community".

Translator
In addition to the main station, WHEO is relayed by an FM translator to widen its broadcast area.

References

External links
WHEO Radio Online

1959 establishments in Virginia
Oldies radio stations in the United States
Radio stations established in 1959
HEO
HEO